Debacle may refer to:

 an event that turns out to be a disaster
 Debacle: The First Decade, an album by the Violent Femmes
 La Débâcle, a novel by Émile Zola
 Debacle, a 2009 Nike SB skateboarding video